Tom McDevitt is the chairman of the board of directors of the Washington Times, a newspaper in Washington DC, United States.  He is a member of the Unification Church (which indirectly owns the Times) and in the early 1980s was the pastor of the church in Washington DC. McDevitt's wife of 20 years, Soon Ja, died in 2002. They have five children.

References

American Unificationists
The Washington Times people
Living people
Year of birth missing (living people)